The 1986 Nutri-Metics Open was a women's tennis tournament played on outdoor grass courts at the ASB Tennis Centre in Auckland in New Zealand and was part of the 1985 Virginia Slims World Championship Series. It was the inaugural edition of the tournament and was held from 9 December until 15 December 1985. Anne Hobbs won the singles title.

Finals

Singles
 Anne Hobbs defeated  Louise Field 6–3, 6–1
 It was Hobbs' 1st singles title of the year and the 2nd of her career.

Doubles
 Anne Hobbs /  Candy Reynolds defeated  Lea Antonoplis /  Adriana Villagrán 6–1, 6–3

See also
 1986 Benson and Hedges Open – men's tournament

References

External links
 Official website
 ITF tournament edition details

Nutri-Metics Open
WTA Auckland Open
Nutri
Ten
December 1985 sports events in New Zealand